Biren Deka is an Indian politician and the General Secretary of the Revolutionary Communist Party of India. He was elected as its General Secretary in 2006. He is also a retired professor of the Department of Economics of Nowgong Girls' College.

References

Living people
Assam politicians
Indian communists
Revolutionary Communist Party of India
Revolutionary Communist Party of India politicians
1947 births